Jyoti Prakash Mishra (born 30 July 1966), better known by his stage name White Town, is a British-Indian singer and musician. He is best known for his 1997 hit song "Your Woman".

Early life
Jyoti Prakash Mishra was born in Rourkela on 30 July 1966, and emigrated to England with his family at the age of three. He grew up in Derby.

Career
White Town was originally the name of a band formed by Mishra in 1989, inspired by a Pixies concert he had attended. Initially, there were other members on guitar, bass, and drums; they played support gigs for various bands, most notably Primal Scream. In 1990, the project released its first self-financed record, White Town EP, on 7" vinyl. This featured Nick Glyn-Davies on drums and Sean Deegan on bass, with Mishra on guitar and vocals. Sean Phillips, who is credited as a guitarist on the EP, joined the band shortly before the release. In time, Deegan and Glyn-Davies left and were replaced live by a drum machine and Leon Wilson on guitar. The rest of the band drifted away in the autumn of 1990, and Mishra continued with the project as a one-man band from then on, occasionally collaborating with musicians such as Gary Thatcher of the Beekeepers on guitar.

The lead single from White Town's second album, Women in Technology, titled "Your Woman", reached No. 1 on the UK Singles Chart in January 1997. It also peaked at No. 1 in Spain and Iceland; No. 2 in Australia; No. 4 in Canada, Denmark, and Finland; and No. 23 on the U.S. Pop Airplay chart. After a troubled working relationship with EMI, Mishra was dropped from the label in 1997. Since then, he has gone back to working with indie labels such as Parasol Records. In 2006, he contributed the song "The PNAC Cabal" to the charity album Voyces United for UNHCR.

The EP A New Surprise was released in September 2006 by Swedish indie label Heavenly Pop Hits, and was followed by the album Don't Mention the War, which launched Mishra's own Bzangy Records label. A 7" White Town single titled "I Wanna Be Your Ex", with the B-side "Rainy Day", was released by Golly Jane Records in November 2014. Mishra released the albums Deemab and Polyamory in 2019. As of March 2020, he accumulates over 500,000 Spotify streams per month; his work received a boost in popularity in 2020 when Dua Lipa sampled the same trumpet hook White Town sampled in "Your Woman" in her song "Love Again".

Artistry
Mishra has said, "I'm a mediocre singer, I'm a terrible guitarist, I'm a pretty good keyboardist, I'm a good producer, not amazing, but good." Noting his status as a one-hit wonder, he said it is "better than a no-hit wonder" and elaborated, "To be a professional musician and to be entertaining people twenty years after my biggest hit, I feel like I'm the luckiest person alive. Just to have one song that connects with people—most musicians dream their entire lives of having that."

Personal life
Mishra became straight edge at the age of sixteen and is a radical Marxist; he has been outspoken about his beliefs. He identifies as genderqueer and polyamorous.

Discography

Albums

Extended plays

Singles

See also
 List of 1990s one-hit wonders in the United States

References

External links
 
 

1966 births
Living people
Indian emigrants to England
British alternative rock musicians
British trip hop musicians
English Marxists
English techno musicians
English dance musicians
Musicians from Derby
People from Sundergarh district
Chrysalis Records artists
Parasol Records artists
Alternative dance musicians
People with non-binary gender identities
Non-binary musicians
Polyamorous people